The yellow-billed lorikeet (Neopsittacus musschenbroekii) is a species of parrot in the family Psittaculidae.
It is found in New Guinea. Its natural habitat is subtropical or tropical moist montane forests.

Description 
The yellow-billed lorikeet has green plumage with a red breast and a bright yellow bill.

References

yellow-billed lorikeet
yellow-billed lorikeet
Taxonomy articles created by Polbot
Birds of New Guinea